Avenue Road is a major north–south street in Toronto, Ontario. The road is a continuation of University Avenue, linked to it via Queen's Park and Queen's Park Crescent East and West to form a single through route. Until January 1, 1998, these roads were designated Highway 11A.

Route
Avenue Road is the western limit of the former town of Yorkville, officially beginning at Bloor Street and ending just north of Highway 401. At its southern terminus, it runs between two of Toronto's major hotels, the Park Hyatt (on the northwest corner of Bloor and Avenue Road) and the Four Seasons Hotel. On the northeast corner of the intersection with Bloor is the Church of the Redeemer. For much of its length the road is fairly residential, with a mix of small businesses, as well as a few large schools and churches. A notable site along this "lower section" is the Hare Krishna Temple, formerly the Avenue Road Church, opposite Dupont Street and across the street from the Anglican Church of The Messiah. Just north of St. Clair Avenue, Avenue Road is interrupted by Upper Canada College, ending at Lonsdale Road and resuming again at Kilbarry Road. The primary traffic route runs east of the school, following widened sections of Lonsdale Road and Oriole Parkway and returning to Avenue Road via Oxton Avenue. (The short section of Avenue Road from Kilbarry to Oxton is an ordinary two-lane side street.)

North of Eglinton Avenue, the former St. James-Bond Church once stood. This building, which used to house two prime downtown congregations – St. James Square (formerly Presbyterian), and Bond Street (formerly Congregationalist) – was built in the late 1920s, and closed in June 2005. It has since been demolished. Near Lawrence Avenue is Havergal College, a large private girls' school. Although in the former city of North York, much of the area considers the school part of North Toronto.

Avenue Road ends at Bombay Avenue, just after crossing Highway 401 (exit 367). Originally, Avenue Road continued from what is now the interchange by angling northeast via the Hogg's Hollow Bridge (across the Don River West Branch) to end at Yonge Street; this section of the road was incorporated into Highway 401 when it was constructed in the 1950s.

A few miles north of Toronto's Avenue Road, there is a separate Avenue Road (which is not considered a resumption after a break such as the case with streets like Kipling or Woodbine Avenues that have separate sections in York Region) in the Yonghurst neighbourhood of Richmond Hill, running almost due north of the Toronto one. This roadway is a residential route from Edgar Avenue to Weldrick Road West.

Name
The thoroughfare's name sounds tautological or self-contradictory from a North American perspective, where avenue is one of the most common generic designations for street names; Robert Fulford once wrote that it "sounded like an identity crisis with pavement".  However, Avenue Road is a common street name elsewhere in the English-speaking world, notably Avenue Road, Bangalore, and in London, where at least 40 streets bear this name. In British English, an avenue is a row of trees, hence Avenue Road denotes a street lined with trees.  Thus one's reaction to the name may be seen as a shibboleth evincing attachment to British or American culture.

A common urban legend about the origin of the name goes as follows: A team of Scottish surveyors were surveying the old town of York and came to a spot on Bloor Street. The leader of the group then pointed north and exclaimed, "Let's 'ave a new road!"

Public Transit
Public transit along Avenue Road is provided by the Toronto Transit Commission, on two, formally three, different bus routes. The two main full-service routes are the 13 Avenue Road, and the 61 Avenue Road North, which provide service south and north of Eglinton Avenue respectively. The former originates from Eglinton station and takes commuters into downtown, and the latter originates from a bus loop at the northern end (Bombay Avenue) and feeds into Eglinton station. There was also an express route, 142 Avenue Road Express, which ran the length of the road, for a direct ride into downtown and the Financial District. It ran during rush hours only and required a double fare, however after the pandemic hit it was discontinued, and it is unknown if it will return.

Landmarks (from south to north)

References

External links
Avenue Road on OpenStreetMap

Roads in Toronto